Poorna may refer to:

People
 Shamna Kasim, an Indian actress also known as Poorna
 Poorna Jagannathan, an American actress
 Malavath Purna (also spelt Poorna), an Indian mountaineer

Other
 Poorna: Courage Has No Limit, a 2017 Indian film
 Poorna Express, an express train in India

See also
 Purna (disambiguation)